Vetrimaaran is an Indian film director, screenwriter and film producer, who works in the Tamil film industry. As of 2021, he has won five National Film Awards, eight Ananda Vikatan Cinema Awards, two Filmfare South Awards and the Amnesty International Italia Award from 72nd Venice Film Festival.

Vetrimaaran made his directorial debut with the Polladhavan (2007). His second feature film Aadukalam (2011) won six National Film Awards. He produces films under his production company, Grass Root Film Company. His movie Visaranai (2016) was selected as India's official entry to the  Academy Awards. His film Asuran (2019) received the National Film Award for Best Feature Film in Tamil.

Personal life
Vetrimaaran was born in Cuddalore in 1975. His father Dr. V. Chitravel was a veterinary scientist and his mother Megala Chitravel is a noted novelist.  He has an older sister. He later moved to Ranipet.

He is married to Aarthi whom he met at Loyola College where he was studying. They have two children, Poonthendrel and Kadiravan.

Career

Late 90s-2007: Beginning directions

While studying English literature at Loyola Collage, he undertook a course on Television presentation at the end of which he had to make a film. While making the film, he learned of his inclination towards filmmaking. Later, he attended a seminar organised by Balu Mahendra, who at that time was a visiting professor at Loyola. Impressed by the veteran filmmaker Vetrimaaran decided that he'd learn filmmaking from him. Balu Mahendra then accepted him as one of his lead assistants. Following that he faced the dilemma of choosing between studies and Film. He opted for the latter which meant he had to opt out-of his course at Loyola. Balu Mahendra expanded his duties for the Tamil serial Kathai Neram (2000) and the Tamil films En Iniya Ponnilave (2001), Julie Ganapathy (2003), and Adhu Oru Kana Kaalam (2005).  He has since credited Balu Mahendra as his mentor and the one who encouraged to follow his dream of becoming a director. He also acted in a brief role as Richard Rishi's assistant in Kadhir's Kadhal Virus (2002).

It was during the making of his mentor's Adhu Oru Kana Kaalam where Vetrimaaran became acquainted with the lead actor of the film, Dhanush. He prepared a script for  Dhanush who immediately accepted the offer after hearing the story. The film titled Desiya Nedunchalai 47 was initially launched with Yuvan Shankar Raja as the music director and Ekambaram as the cinematographer. After he found trouble finding producers with A. M. Rathnam and Salem Chandrasekhar leaving the project after initial interest, Dhanush's sister Dr. Vimala Geetha agreed to produce the film, but she also dropped the film. Dhanush's father Kasthuri Raja finally agreed to produce the film, and Kirat Bhattal was signed as heroine, while Harris Jayaraj was selected as music director. However, after two days of shoot, the film was shelved, and Dhanush opted to pursue other films after the surprise success of his Thiruvilayadal Arambam. The film's collapse saw Vetrimaaran approach producer Kadiresan and narrated to him the stories he had prepared, but the producer did not like Desiya Nedunchaalai 47, but agreed to work on another project titled Polladhavan (2007).

Vetrimaaran has since described that he had "ample time" for the production works of Polladhavan as "Dhanush had confidence in him". Production designer Durai helped him rope in G. V. Prakash Kumar to score the film's music, while Dhanush also recommended cinematographer Velraj to Vetrimaaran after the pair had worked together in Parattai Engira Azhagu Sundaram (2007). Vetrimaaran chose the  Kannada language actor Kishore to make his Tamil film debut after his assistant gave him rave reviews of the actor's performance in the unfinished Prashanth-starrer Petrol. The team held test shoots with both Kajal Aggarwal and Poonam Bajwa for the film and released the stills to the media, but Vetrimaaran was still unsatisfied and finished two schedules before finalising on Divya Spandana. The director revealed that there was initially an issue with the actress after she got offended by his words and did not come for the shoot for three days, before Durai intervened. The film's story was inspired partly by the lost bike of his friend Andrew and the variety of experiences he had tracking down his vehicle. Vetrimaaran revealed that when he wrote the script, he made many changes to suit the visual medium and for Dhanush on his physical attributes while playing an action hero. The film opened in November 2007 to rave reviews, with the critic from Sify.com stating that "Vetri has made his mentor proud, and his style of narration and takings are very similar to the ace director Balu Mahendra, labelling that the film had shades of Vittorio De Sica's 1948 Italian film, Bicycle Thieves. When questioned about its relevance to Bicycle Thieves, he stated that it "is a disgrace to Bicycle Thieves if it is compared with Polladhavan". The reviewer from The Hindu stated that "at no point does Polladhavan sag and that writer-director Vetrimaaran has slogged through his screenplay and the result shows." The film subsequently went on to win four Vijay Awards including Best Director for Vetrimaaran.

2011-2015: Breakthrough and National acclaim

Following the success of Polladhavan, the entire team of that film: Vetrimaaran, Dhanush, Kishore, producer S. Kathiresan, and G. V. Prakash Kumar collaborated once again for Aadukalam (2011), which deals with the rivalry between cock-fighters in Madurai. During Pre-production and scripting, Vetrimaaran spent a period of two years in Madurai to understand the local dialect and lifestyle of the people living there. Aadukalam was the first film of Vetrimaaran to have a production office set up outside of Chennai. Vetrimaaran took a year to complete the screenplay, script, and dialogues for Aadukalam and held a bounded script for the venture, which is considered rare in Tamil films. Vetrimaaran narrated only half of the film's script to Dhanush before the latter was impressed with it and agreed to act in the film. The film was initially titled Seval, but since the rights to the title were already taken by director Hari for his project with Bharath, Vetrimaaran decided to rename his film as Aadukalam.

The film languished in production hell for two years due to constant changing in cast, crew and location, but Vetrimaaran, Dhanush, Kishore, Kathiresan and G. V. Prakash Kumar remained on. Vetrimaaran introduced two newcomers who made their Tamil debuts: Taapsee Pannu and Sri Lankan Tamil writer and political commentator V. I. S. Jayapalan, while future Vetrimaaran collaborators Dinesh, Murugadoss and Naren made their breakthroughs through this film.

Upon release, Aadukalam received critical acclaim and was a commercial success. Sify called it "a gutsy and brilliant film" and mentioned that it " lives up to the expectation that the film carried and the credit goes to Vetrimaran whose research and hard work shows on screen". Behindwoods wrote "Aadukalam is an attempt that requires appreciation where the director has hacked his way through the path less trodden with aplomb". Karthik Subramanian of The Hindu praised the film stating that "The detailing of every characters in the story is intricate. The narrative moves like a good novel where the first few chapters are all about etching and detailing the players, and the plot and the action unfold much later". Pavithra Srinivasan of Rediff.com called it "one of Dhanush's best works to date". Tamil magazine Ananda Vikatan rated the film with 44 marks and mentioned that "This arena is new for presenting cultural nuances of a region and changes in human emotions beautifully". At the 58th National Film Awards ceremony, the film walked away with the maximum trophies, including Best Director and Best Screenplay for Vetrimaaran.

In 2012, Vetrimaaran launched his own production house called the Grass Root Film Company and launched his maiden project, Udhayam NH4 (2013) with Siddharth in the lead role and his associate Manimaran as director. He wrote the dialogues of Naan Rajavaga Pogiren (2013) directed by newcomer Prithvi Rajkumar. In 2014, his production Poriyaalan, dubbed as a sort of sibling toPolladhavan was released to critical appreciation. In 2015, the Children's film Kaaka Muttai (2015), directed by Manikandan and jointly produced by Dhanush's Wunderbar Films and Grassroot Film Company received critical acclaim from all around India and won the Best Children's Film Award at the 62nd National Film Awards. This film proved to be a breakthrough for actress Aishwarya Rajesh who later collaborated with Vetrimaaran in Vada Chennai.

2016-present: Further success

Vetrimaaran's third venture was the crime-thriller Visaranai (2015), which was produced by Dhanush's Wunderbar Productions, and based on M. Chandrakumar's novel Lock Up. The film deals with the lives of a few Tamil laborers subject to horrific atrocities committed by the police in which they are unable to escape from. Vetrimaaran chose to begin the film before the schedule for his other venture Vada Chennai (2018) and reunited with actors Dinesh, Murugadoss and Kishore, where the first two play the main Tamil laborers, while the latter plays an auditor. Though he had dubbed for Kishore in Aadukalam, Samuthirakani made this film his maiden acting collaboration with Vetrimaaran, portraying as a hard nosed yet sympathetic police inspector, while Telugu film actor Ajay Ghosh made his breakthrough as a Telugu soft speaking, yet "villainous" inspector in Guntur. The film earlier had the working titles of Kutravaali and Lock-Up, during the first schedule in Guindy. The first half of the film was finished completely in September 2014 in locations across Hyderabad. The director later announced that the film would be an experimental film lasting only 60 minutes.

Upon release, Visaranai received universal acclaim. In India, IndiaGlitz.com had rated the film 4.5 out of 5 and said, "Visaranai is by no means only an art or docu film, but fits into the commercial arena as well as it has thrills, especially a nail biting climax, humour, action, a little painful love story in the background and above all filled with real life incidents which one can easily relate to". Twitch Film viewed Visarnai as a top class film about reality comparable to 2012 Cannes favourite Gangs of Wasseypur. Baradwaj Rangan, then of The Hindu wrote "Visaranai is beautifully filmed, though there isn't much room for beauty. The frames appear to have been snatched from the back alleys of life. The verité illusion is aided by the utterly lifelike performances—even if the word "performance" seems wrong.". Rediff wrote "Director Vetrimaaran deserves credit for having extracted the best from all his actors. They are so remarkable you sense their terror as they stutter and stumble with their broken and bruised bodies. The hard-hitting screenplay is relentless, making no effort to shield you from the harsh realities of the ruthless world we live in today." Behindwoods wrote "Some may call Visaranai to be a violent film, while most of the others may say it is a brilliant piece of art that is so real and suspenseful. But if you’re a fan of crime thriller or film that depicts pain, do not miss it!" Overseas, Hollywood Reporter wrote "Vetri Maaran’s tense socio-political thriller lands a well-aimed punch at rampant police brutality and corruption, to which the only response from the viewer is towering indignation. It may not break new ground in its subject or style of narration, but it covers the old ground extremely well, and its premise is so convincing and realistic that it seems like non-fiction. The first part, at least, is non-fiction, while the film’s second half turns into a fast-paced thriller...Maaran and Kumar extend the horror to include the upper echelons in the police and government, who also need scapegoats to cover their crimes. This mirror plot becomes an ever more threatening nocturnal thriller, and takes the film much wider in terms of potential audience."
 
Visaranai got a standing ovation at the 72nd Venice Film Festival and won the Amnesty International Italia Award. It was India's official entry in the Foreign Language film category at the 2017 Academy Awards, but failed to get nominated. In India, the film also won three National Film awards - Best Feature Film in Tamil, Best Supporting Actor for Samuthirakani and Best Editing for Kishore Te and G. B. Venkatesh  and numerous awards at Ananda Vikatan and Filmfare South.

Vetrimaaran also produced three films in a row with Kodi (2016), Lens (2017) and Annanukku Jai (2018).

Vetrimaaran's fourth directorial venture which he had been preparing for since 2009, Vada Chennai saw him reunite with Dhanush, Samuthirakani, Kishore, Daniel Balaji, Pawan, cinematographer Velraj, art director Jacki and editor G. B. Venkatesh. The film is about a skilled carrom player who becomes a reluctant participant in a gang war between two rival gangsters. Like Aadukalam, the film went through production and development hell over a period of 9 years with huge changes in cast and crew and a lot of scouting and research, yet Vetrimaaran made sure it was not shelved. Actors Ameer, Aishwarya Rajesh, Radha Ravi and Andrea Jeremiah and music director Santhosh Narayanan made their maiden collaborations with Vetrimaaran through this film, though Radha Ravi and Andrea had dubbed for VIS Jayapal and Taapsee Pannu in Aadukalam earlier. The film ran into controversy from the fisherfolk community, because of a love-making scene between Ameer and Andrea filmed in a boat, which was considered to be offensive for the community. As a result, Vetrimaaran in a video statement, apologised to anyone who may have been hurt by the offensive scenes and agreed to remove them from the film.

After a long delay, Vada Chennai was released on 18 October 2018, opening with critical and commercial acclaim, with critics praising the story, screenplay and each of the actors' performance. Janani K, a critic from India Today gave a rating of 4 stars (out of 5) and said that "Vada Chennai has everything you look for in a gangster thriller. But Vetri Maaran's display of twists and turns will win you over." The Indian Express-based critic Manoj Kumar R. assigned 5/5 rating for the film, saying "Vada Chennai is the closest you can get to unforgiving underworld filled with insecurity, revenge, destiny, rage and insatiable urge for bloodshed. It is not the story that stands out in Vada Chennai. It is how beautifully Vetrimaaran has captured the lifestyle of a place, which is so close and yet so far away from the advancement of modern civilization." Sowmya Rajendran, editor-in-chief of The News Minute wrote "From the colourful curses of the street to each of the characters, the film gives us a very real glimpse of gang wars. Vetrimaaran-Dhanush delivers a brilliant gangster film." Baradwaj Rangan of Film Companion South wrote "Dhanush's ascent to stardom has come alongside his growth as an actor, and there’s not one scene where he makes us doubt his character's actions. The actors are so good (Ameer is a standout) and the film's parts are so much greater than the whole that savouring them becomes its own kind of satisfaction. With his outstanding cinematographer Velraj, Vetrimaaran unleashes one flamboyant scene after another." Vada Chennai earned  at the worldwide box office and Dhanush received numerous accolades for his role.

Producer Kalaipuli S. Thanu signed Vetrimaaran and Dhanush to a new film, Asuran which saw the duo reunite with music director G. V. Prakash Kumar, cinematographer Velraj and actors Naren, Pawan and Munnar Ramesh, the latter of whom has featured in all of Vetrimaaran's feature films from Polladhavan onwards. The film's plot is based on Poomani's novel Vekkai and is influenced by the real-life Kilvenmani massacre that occurred in 1968. Dhanush plays a lower class farmer who has to protect his family when his youngest son murders a rich upper class landlord and would be seen in two looks: one as a young man in a flashback and the second as a middle-aged man in the present. Manju Warrier made her Tamil debut with this film alongside young actors Ken Karunas, Teejay Arunasalam and Ammu Abhirami and veteran actors Prakash Raj and Pasupathy making their maiden collaborations with Vetrimaaran. The film was shot at a brisk pace, starting from January 2019 at Tirunelveli and ended in June.

Upon release on October 4, 2019, the film received mixed to positive critical reviews. The Times of India, rated 3.5 out of 5 stars, stating that "Vetri Maaran delivers yet another solid action drama that keeps us engrossed from start to finish." S. Subhakeerthana from The Indian Express rated the film 4 out of 5 and reviewed it as "With this Dhanush starrer, Vetrimaaran proves he's one of the finest directors in Indian cinema, yet again. Only a few filmmakers like him can pull off a mainstream cinema, balancing ‘realism’ and commercial elements." Sify rated the film 4.5 out of 5, summarising that "Asuran is a must-watch. Dhanush-Vetrimaaran combo who has once again delivered a raw, rustic, and riveting revenge drama. Don't miss this one!" Sreedhar Pillai from Firstpost rated the film 4 out of 5 and posted a verdict " Asuran is one of the best films of the year and a must-watch. Vetrimaran keeps the flag of good cinema flying high.". In contrast, Baradwaj Rangan of Film Companion South wrote, "None of the characters feel fully formed because the timelines feel rushed. We don’t feel time and lives weigh down on us the way it did in Vada Chennai or Visaranai. Maybe it’s the on/off voiceovers, which feel like hastily applied band-aids over sore spots in the storytelling. But the bigger absence is the lack of set pieces. Vetri Maaran seems to be holding back almost deliberately, as though mirroring his leading man". Gauthaman Baskaran from News18, gave a rating of 2 out of 5, stating that "Coming at a time when graphic and lurid on-screen violence is being questioned and even condemned, Asuran would appear needlessly falling back to the old formula.".

Commercially, the film became a blockbuster at the box office, entering the  club and is currently the highest-grossing film of Vetrimaaran's career. It won numerous awards including 2 National Awards: Best Feature Film in Tamil and Best Actor for Dhanush. In the same year, Vetrimaaran collaborated with Suresh Kamatchi for their production, Miga Miga Avasaram (2019).

On 27 September 2020, Vetrimaaran was honored by a Special Award "Thirai Asuran" in a virtual conference appreciating his effort talking about long time issue Panchami Land in his last movie Asuran by Ambedkar Makkal Iyakkam. He made a short film "Oor Iravu" starring Sai Pallavi and Prakash Raj for the anthology Paava Kadhaigal (2020). Each of the short films touches upon the issue of honour killing. "Oor Iravu" received positive acclaim with Baradwaj Rangan of Film Companion South writing, "Vetri Maaran’s is the most powerful, most gut-churning installment. There’s a prolonged stretch of agony that seems endless: for the father, for the daughter, and for the audience. The house becomes a character of its own, with its clearly established geography...It may seem strange to say this, given Vetri Maaran’s terrific run of films, but Oor Iravu is his best-directed work." Filmmaker Anurag Kashyap in a conversation with Vetrimaaran told "Congratulations!, Vetri, I think, this is your most poignant work. I have not been so impacted and moved in such a long time. Also I think its one of your best work. This (film) is so assured and so confident in the sense that it looks like, its been put together and I'm seeing it the way it was shot"

Filmography

Film

Web series

Acting 
Kadhal Virus (2002) - Deepak's assistant (uncredited role)
Jigarthanda (2014) - himself (Guest appearance)

References

Works cited

External links
 

Tamil film directors
Living people
Film directors from Tamil Nadu
Film producers from Tamil Nadu
Best Director National Film Award winners
People from Cuddalore district
Tamil film producers
1975 births
Best Original Screenplay National Film Award winners
Indian film directors